Filiz Akın (born Suna Akın, 2 January 1943) is a Turkish actress, writer and TV presenter. Known as Yeşilçam Turkish cinema's "noble, modern, urban and elegant face", Filiz Akın gained a huge fan base in Turkey.

Life and career

Early life 
Filiz Akın was born on 2 January 1943 in Ankara. Her mother Habibe Leman Şaşırmaz was a tailor from Ankara, and her father Bekir Sami Akın was a judge from Afyonkarahisar. Her mother was of Albanian descent on her paternal side, while her father was of Circassian descent on his maternal side. She has a sister Günseli from her mother's second marriage. Her grandmother, Halime Hanım's father was a clerk of Atatürk, and her stepfather was Atatürk's executive assistant and would ask Halime Hanım's help in Atatürk's attire for state occasions. Filiz Akın lived in Beypazarı, where her father was working, until the age of 3. At the age of 5, she started attending primary school. She finished her primary education at Sarar Elementary School in Kızılay, Ankara. Her parents divorced when she was 7 years old.

College years 
Filiz Akın continued her education at TED Ankara College Foundation Schools through boarding and scholarship. She received various awards at the school with her paintings and compositions. She passed all the classes successfully, and was chosen as an ideal student by her teachers. Her best-known hidden talent at school was her very good imitation. In June 1960, she graduated from college. After finishing her studies, she started working at the Ankara branch of American Export-Isbrandtsen Lines. After working at the company for 2 years, she became the head of its marine branch. She learned English, French, and a little bit of Italian. 
Meanwhile, she attended Ankara University, Faculty of Language, History and Geography for a semester and studied archaeology.

Rise to fame 
With the insistence of her friend Oya San's mother, Akın participated at a competition organized by Artist magazine and became the winner in 1962. After she was told that she would receive the award only if she would play in the movie Akasyalar Açarken, she refused to accept it. Journalists and filmmakers came from Istanbul to Ankara to convince her, but she still refused to accept the deal. But when Memduh Ün came to Ankara and insisted on it, she accepted to play in the film. She left the university and work and came to Istanbul with her mother. Trusting the executives of the magazine and Memduh Ün, who convinced her to take the role, helped Akın start her film career. She signed the agreement and after shooting her first film Akasyalar Açarken opposite Göksel Arsoy in 1962, the producers prepared a program for her during the entire year.

1962–1975 
Umutsuzlar, Ankara Ekspresi, Utanç, Dağlar Kızı Reyhan and Yankesici Kız were among her most famous movies. In 1971, for her role in Ankara Ekspresi she won the best actress award at the 8th International Antalya Film Festival. From May 1962 to September 1972, she starred in more than 105 films. After appearing in 116 films Akın ended her cinema career in 1975. Together with actors Türkan Şoray, Hülya Koçyiğit and Fatma Girik, she left a mark on Turkish cinema and has been accepted as one of the four influential actresses of her time.

In 1965, her son İlker from her first marriage to Türker İnanoğlu was born. During this period the family resided at Şişli. In 1974, the couple divorced after 10 years of marriage.

1975–1982 
After ending her cinema career, she played in Istanbul Bank's commercials and in 1977 she presented the music program Podyum Show on TRT. In 1979, she took a role in Haldun Dormen'in play Bir Ayrılık.

In 1979, she performed as a headliner at the Izmir International Fair.

In September 1979 she was stabbed in the leg by an attacker while entering the İzmir Efes Hotel. The attacker who was captured immediately, said to the prosecutor that he was in love with Filiz Akın but after she refused his advances, he decided to stab her. He later changed his confession and said that he was asked by mafia boss Mehmet Nabi İnciler to perform this act. Filiz Akın survived the attack with a slight wound and at the same night appeared on stage.

1982–2002 
For 11 years, Akın lived in Neuilly and Bougival in Paris, and then moved to the Turkish embassy in Paris for the next 4 years, making her stay in France 15 years.

In 1982, she married Bubi Rubinstein. They divorced in 1993 after 11 years of marriage.

In May 1994, she married chief of the National Intelligence Organization Sönmez Köksal in Ankara.
After marriage, the couple settled in Ankara. The witnesses to their marriage were President Süleyman Demirel and Speaker of the Grand National Assembly of Turkey Hüsamettin Cindoruk.

Her husband Sönmez Köksal was appointed as ambassador to France in February 1998 and for 4 years they lived at the Turkish embassy in Paris. To promote Turkey and its culture in Paris, she organized a Turkish-Ottoman products exhibition in La Fayette, and Lale Park and Turkish Painters Exhibition in Bagatelle. These actions made Filiz Akın a cultural ambassador, who with her efforts influenced the French by Turkish culture.

In 1991, her father Sami Akın died in İzmir.

2002–present 
In 2002, she learned that she had some kind of cancer of the nose and mouth (nasopharynx). She received treatment at the MD Anderson Cancer Center of the University of Texas and her cancer was cured.

From 2004 to 2007, she worked as a columnist for Sabah.

In 2005, for the benefit of Turkey Breast Foundation and to support the "yellow bracelets against cancer," she launched a campaign, and more than 1 million bracelets were sold. In 2005, she supported the promotion of the "blue bracelet" campaign organized for the benefit of the Hacettepe University Hope House project, organized to raise awareness of cancer in the community. From 2007, she has been a supporter of "Türkiye'de İşitmeyen Kalmasın", a project initiated by The Starkey Hearing Foundation's and Turkey EMÖV Foundation.

In 2006, the street where she lived until she was 3 years old, was named as "Filiz Akın Sokak" by the city council in Beypazarı. In 2008, she presented the program "Filiz Akın'la Sohbetler" on Kanal 1. In 2009, she presented "Filiz Akın'la Hafta Sonu Sohbetleri" on Habertürk TV.

In November 2013, she met her fans for her third book, Lezzete Merhaba'''s signature day at the 32nd Tüyap Istanbul Book Fair. Filiz Akın is a member of the Board of Trustees of TED University.

 Awards 

 1971 International Antalya Film Festival, Best Actress, Ankara Ekspresi 1972 School of Journalists, Best Female Artist in Cinema
 1974 Turkish Journalists' Association, Female Artist of the Year
 2000 37th International Antalya Film Festival, Lifetime Honorary Award
 2001 Golden Orange Culture and Art Foundation, Lifetime Honorary Award
 2004 Contemporary Cinema Actors Association, Acting Award of 2004
 2005 74th Izmir International Fair, "Sinema Burada Festival"'s Lifetime Honorary Award,
 2005 Magazine Journalists Association, 12th Golden Objective Awards, Honorary Award
 2006 Isparta Süleyman Demirel University, honorary doctor degree
 2008 45th Antalya Golden Orange Film Festival,"Festival Order"
 2009 16th International Adana Film Festival, Lifetime Honorary Award
 2010 Yeşilçam Awards, Culture and Art Service Award
 2010 21st Ankara International Film Festival, Aziz Nesin Labor Award
 2010 Beykent University, Turkish Cinema Day of Love, Honorary Award
 2011 6th International Dadaş Film Festival, Honorary Award
 2012 Magazine Journalists Association, 18th Golden Objective Awards, Honorary Award  
 2012 Datça Golden Almond Cinema and Culture Festival, Honorary AwardDatça Altın Badem Sinema ve Kültür Festivali Cumhuriyet, Retrieved 21 January 2014
 2013 4th Malatya International Film Festival, Honorary Award
 2014 Turkish Thai Friendship Award
 2014 Magazine Journalists' Association, 20th Golden Objective Awards, Lifetime Profession Honorary Award
 2015 Red Tulip Film Festival, Lifetime Achievement Award
 2015 15th Frankfurt Turkish Film Festival, Honorary Award
 2015 1st Çanakkale Short Film Festival, Honorary Award

 Books 
 "Güzelliklere Merhaba", Altın Kitaplar Yayınevi, 1992
 "Hayata Merhaba", Epsilon, 2005
 "Filiz Akın ile Güzellik, Zayıflama ve Genç Kalma Üzerine" (2006)
 "Lezzete Merhaba" (2013)

 Books about her 
 "Dört Yapraklı Yonca, Onların Sihri Neydi?" , Bircan Usallı Silan, Epsilon, 2004 
 "Başrolde Filiz Akın: Türk sineması'nda ikonografik ve toplumbilimsel bir değer olarak Filiz Akın", Pınar Çekirge, Epsilon, 2007
 Akın's portraits have appeared in Atıf Yılmaz's "Hayallerim, Aşkım ve Sinema" (1990), Türker İnanoğlu's "Bay Sinema" (2004), and Agâh Özgüç's "Türk Sineması’nın Kadınları''" (2008).

Filmography

References

External links
 Biography of Filiz Akın 
 Gumusperde - Online Filiz Akın Movies
 Official Instagram account
 

1943 births
Living people
Turkish film actresses
Turkish female models
Turkish people of Circassian descent
Actresses from Ankara
TED Ankara College Foundation Schools alumni
Best Actress Golden Orange Award winners
Golden Orange Life Achievement Award winners
20th-century Turkish actresses